Liv Thorsen (31 May 1935 – 21 December 2021) was a Norwegian actress, best known for her role as Elna in the Norwegian situation comedy Mot i brøstet. Thorsen died on 21 December 2021, at the age of 86.

Select filmography
1999 - Tusenårsfesten
1999 - Karl & Co (TV series)
1993 - Mot i brøstet (TV series)
1993 - Fredrikssons Fabrikk (TV series)
1992 - Dødelig kjemi (Miniseries)
1991 - For dagene er onde
1990 - A Handful of Time
1988 - Peer Gynt (TV)
1988 - Begynnelsen på en historie
1984 - SK 917 har nettopp landet (miniseries)
1980  - Den som henger i en tråd (TV)
1981 - Martin
1978 - Operasjon Cobra
1977 - Karjolsteinen
1976 - Lasse & Geir
1976 - To akter for fem kvinner (TV)
1974 - Kimen
1973 - Anton
1973 - Fem døgn i august
1972 - Kampen om Mardøla
1971 - Voldtekt
1969 - An-Magritt
1964 - Alle tiders kupp
1962 - Sønner av Norge kjøper bil
1958 - Ut av mørket

References

External links

1935 births
2021 deaths
Norwegian film actresses
Norwegian television actresses
People from Porsgrunn